Yevgen Bolibrukh (born August 15, 1983) is a Ukrainian professional racing cyclist.

Career highlights

 2006: 3rd in Moscow, 1 km (RUS)
 2007: 3rd in Sydney, 1 km (AUS)
 2007: 2nd in Beijing, 1 km (CHN)
 2008: 2nd in Los Angeles, 1 km (USA)

External links

Ukrainian male cyclists
Ukrainian track cyclists
1983 births
Living people
Place of birth missing (living people)
21st-century Ukrainian people